Grant Michael Martin (born March 13, 1962 in Smooth Rock Falls, Ontario) is a Canadian retired ice hockey player. Drafted in 1980 by the Vancouver Canucks, Martin also played for the Washington Capitals.

Career statistics

External links

Profile at hockeydraftcentral.com

1962 births
Canadian ice hockey centres
Binghamton Whalers players
EC VSV players
Fredericton Express players
JYP Jyväskylä players
Kitchener Rangers players
Rochester Americans players
Vancouver Canucks draft picks
Vancouver Canucks players
Washington Capitals players
Schwenninger Wild Wings players
Living people
People from Cochrane District
Canadian expatriate ice hockey players in Germany